Leviellus, synonym Stroemiellus, is a genus of orb-weaver spiders first described by J. Wunderlich in 2004.

Species
 it contains six species across Europe and Asia:
Leviellus caspicus (Simon, 1889) – Central Asia, Iran
Leviellus inconveniens (O. Pickard-Cambridge, 1872) – Lebanon, Israel
Leviellus kochi (Thorell, 1870) – Southern Europe, North Africa, Central Asia
Leviellus poriensis (Levy, 1987) – Israel
Leviellus stroemi (Thorell, 1870) – Europe, Russia (Europe to Far East), Kazakhstan, Korea
Leviellus thorelli (Ausserer, 1871) – France, Central, Southern and South-Eastern Europe

References

Araneidae
Araneomorphae genera
Spiders of Asia